David Bey (March 11, 1957 – September 13, 2017) was a heavyweight boxer who held the USBA title. He unsuccessfully challenged Larry Holmes for the heavyweight title in 1985.

Bey was an outstanding amateur boxer who had taken up the sport to lose weight and eventually competed on the U.S. All Army Boxing Team. He made his professional debut in 1981, defeating future undisputed world heavyweight champion James "Buster" Douglas by a second-round knockout. He built up a record of 14–0, becoming the first man to stop the durable veteran contender George Chaplin (TKO4) as well as defeating future WBA heavyweight champion Greg Page (W12) to capture the United States Boxing Association heavyweight championship.

In March 1985 Bey was given a title shot by IBF heavyweight champion Larry Holmes. After a strong start, Holmes knocked Bey  down twice in the 8th round and the referee stopped the fight in the 10th round.

Bey never regained his confidence, losing his USBA title by 11th-round TKO to Trevor Berbick in his comeback fight, then being relegated to 'opponent' status for the remainder of his career, matched against the likes of James "Bonecrusher" Smith, Joe Bugner in Australia, Tyrell Biggs, and Johnny DuPlooy in South Africa. He retired in 1987 after losing to DuPlooy, but made a comeback in 1990 in which he went 3-5-1. In 1994 in his final fight he knocked out David Jaco in China. He lived in China for a time before returning to the States and his old construction job. 

Bey died in a construction accident in Camden in 2017.

Professional boxing record

References

External links
 

1957 births
2017 deaths
Accidental deaths in New Jersey
American male boxers
Boxers from Philadelphia
Heavyweight boxers